WKLK (1230 AM) is a radio station broadcasting an adult standards/nostalgia format. Licensed to Cloquet, Minnesota, United States, the station serves the Duluth area. The station is owned by the Fond du Lac Band of Lake Superior Chippewa, and features programming from AP Radio and Westwood One.

References

External links

Radio stations in Minnesota
Adult standards radio stations in the United States
Fond du Lac Band of Lake Superior Chippewa
Cloquet, Minnesota